Templemichael  is a  civil parish in County Longford, Ireland. Templemichael is also a Church of Ireland parish in the Diocese of Kilmore, Elphin and Ardagh. Churches within this Anglican parish include Saint John's Church (Templemichael) in Longford town.

References

Civil parishes of County Longford